Fred Bukaty (February 13, 1936 – December 18, 2007) was an American football fullback. He played for the Denver Broncos in 1961.

References

1936 births
2007 deaths
American football fullbacks
Kansas Jayhawks football players
Denver Broncos players